The Yusufeli Dam is an arch dam on the Çoruh River near Yusufeli in Artvin Province within the eastern Black Sea region of Turkey. The Yusufeli Dam will be the second largest dam within the larger Çoruh River Development Plan, which plans to build 13 dams, of which two are operational and another two are under construction. The dam's main purpose is hydroelectric power production and it will support a 540 MW power station. The dam is controversial because of its projected impact on the biodiversity within its reservoir area along with the relocation of locals.

On February 26, 2013, the foundation stone was laid in a ceremony attended by Minister of Forestry and Waterworks Veysel Eroğlu and Minister of Labor and Social Security Faruk Çelik. It is expected that the construction of the dam will cost 487 million (approx. US$270 million). The dam's opening date was initially set to May 29, 2018. As of 2018, the expected opening date was delayed to 2021. As of 2023, Yusufeli Dam is the highest dam in Turkey and  the fifth tallest dam in the world.

History
The first studies on the Yusufeli Dam were carried out in the 1970s and it was included in the Coruh River Hydropower Development Master Plan in 1982. The feasibility report was completed in 1986 and the project was added to the national plan in 1997.

Design

Within the power station will be 3 x 180 MW vertical shaft Francis turbines.

Design activities will be carried out by Su-Yapi Engineering and Consulting Inc.

Construction is to be carried out by a Limak Holding-Cengiz Holding-Kolin consortium.

Projected biological impacts 
If built, Yusufeli Dam is expected to have significant biological impacts including:

Adversely affecting 21 nationally listed threatened plant species, (including Iris taochia) of which all except one are endemic to Turkey. Of these threatened species 2 taxa are limited to Yusufeli and its surroundings, 8 are limited to the Çoruh Valley, and 6 to the Artvin-Erzurum area. Turkish Red Book for Plants shows that of these, 7 species are critically endangered, 5 are endangered and 9 are vulnerable.
Adversely affecting 12 nationally listed threatened mammal species including the; wild goat (Capra aegagrus), chamois (Rupicapra rupicapra), Persian squirrel (Sciurus anomalus), forest dormouse (Dryomys nitedula), brown bear (Ursus arctos), Eurasian badger (Meles meles), gray wolf (Canis lupus), Mediterranean horseshoe bat (Rhinolophus euryale), lesser horseshoe bat (Rhinolophus hipposideros), greater mouse-eared bat (Myotis myotis), Schreibers’ bat (Miniopterus schreibersii) and pipistrelle bat (Pipistrellus pipistrellus). Of these species the Mediterranean bat and wild goat are internationally listed on IUCN Red List of Threatened Species.
Adversely affecting 2 nationally threatened fish species, the Black Sea salmon (Salmo trutta labrax) and brown trout (Salmo trutta macrostigma). The Black Sea salmon's migration will be blocked because of this and the other planned and built dams. Existing populations of fish will be adversely affected by the construction of the dam and another 6 species populations may not recover due to the reduction of creek and river habitat needed for breeding.
Potentially adversely affecting 5 butterfly and 1 dragonfly regionally rare species (Polyommatus poseidon, Pseudophilotes vicrama, Pyrgus cirsii, Scolitantides orion, Thymelicus acteon, and Onychogomphus assimilis)  of which 2 are listed in the IUCN Red List Pyrgus cirsii and Onychogomphus assimilis.

See also

Arkun Dam – upstream
Artvin Dam – downstream

References 

Hydroelectric power stations in Turkey
Dams on the Çoruh River
Dams in Artvin Province
Underground power stations
Arch dams